All I Wanna Do is a 2011 Moroccan documentary film produced by La Prod and directed by Michelle Medina starring Omar Sayed Nass El Ghiwane and Don Bigg, Simohamed, a parking guard and his 17-year-old son, Ayoub. The documentary was shot on location in Casablanca, Morocco from 2009 to 2010 and has won a documentary prize at the 2011 Athens International Film Festival and was nominated at the 2011 Aljazeera International Documentary Film Festival for "Best Film" and "Best Director" at the 2011 World Music and Independent Film Festival in Washington, DC.

Plot
The film follows the dreams of 48-year-old Simohamed who works as a parking guard and his 17-year-old son Ayoub, who acts in Hollywood films such as Charlie Wilson's War and with Hollywood actors like Brad Pitt. When Ayoub's dreams of going to Hollywood are dashed, he turns to music and forms a hip hop group with his father. Like fish out of water, the duo set out to meet their heroes, enter studios and radio stations for the first time in an adventure through the music industry of Casablanca.

External links 
 

Moroccan documentary films
2011 documentary films
2011 films
2010s Arabic-language films